The Stitches is an American 1970s-style punk rock band formed in 1993 in Orange County, California, United States. The Stitches record on independent labels such as Disaster, Gold Standard Laboratories, Vinyl Dog, Suburbia, TKO, and Kapow.

Current band members are Mike Lohrman on vocals, Johnny Witmer on guitar, Pete Archer on bass, Jim Kaa on guitar and Craig Barker on drums.  Former members include drummer Johnny Sleeper and guitarist Logan Graham and Retard Ron and Ted.

In 2008, Witmer co-founded The Crazy Squeeze with Sleeper, Graham and Tara Belle of Long Beach-based Ciril.

Discography

Albums 
 8x12 (1995)
 12 Imaginary Inches (2002)
 You Better Shut Up and Listen (Live Album on Picture Disc)(2002)
 Live @ Der Weinerschnitzel 2003 DVD (2010)
 Unzip My Baby...All 7 inches (collection of all 7"s on 1 LP) (Wanda Records- 2013)

EPs 
 4 More Songs from the Stitches
 5 More Songs from the Stitches
 Do The Jetset  (2011 Vinyl Dog)
 D- Demos 7" (2013 Modern Action Records)

Singles 
 "V/A You Know It's a Product..." (1994)
 "Sixteen" / "Something New" (1994)
 "Two New Cuts" (1995)
 "Sixteen" / "Heaven" (1995)
 "Talk Sick" (1997)
 "2nd Chance" (1997)
 "Living' at 110" (1997)
 "You Tear Me Out" (1997)
 "Cars of Today" split w/Le Shok (1999)
 "Automatic" (2002)
 "Monday Morning Ornaments" (2010)
 "Split w/ The Gaggers" (2013)
 "Split w/ Miscalculations" (2014)

Compilations 
 It Smells Like Spring (1997)
 Old Skars And Upstarts (1998) (includes "Livin’ At 110")
 Viva la Vinyl Vol. No. 3 (1999) (includes "I Just Wanna Fuck")
 A Fistful Of Rock-N-Roll Vol. No. 3 (2000) (includes "My Baby Hates Me")
 Punch Drunk III (2001) (includes "Cars Of Today")
 Old Skars And Upstarts 2001 (2001) (includes "Pick Me Up")
 Old Skars And Upstarts 2002 (2002) (includes "Electroshock Carol")
 The L.A. Shakedown (2003) (includes "Automatic")
 Punch Drunk V (includes "Better Looks (When You're Dead)") (2004)
 A Tale Of Rotten Orange (2010) (includes "Monday Morning Ornaments")

External links
The Stitches interview Thrasher Magazine - June 2002

Punk rock groups from California
Musical groups from Orange County, California